Austria has six national parks, all of them internationally accepted according to the IUCN standard. The first national park, Hohe Tauern, was established in 1981. They include each of Austria's most important natural landscape types — alluvial forest, Alpine massif, Pannonian steppe and rocky valleys.

Development

First plans for the protection of the Hohe Tauern mountain range were evolved by Austrian Alpine Club, which in 1915-18 acquired large mountainous areas. However, the national park project was abandoned in the late 1930s and not resumed until 1971, when the federal states of Salzburg, Tyrol and Carinthia signed the Heiligenblut Agreement, followed by similar initiatives in Lower and Upper Austria.

The establishment of each national park took several years; as conflicts of use and the question of funding had to be resolved. The parks are managed by contracts between one or more of the federal states and the Federal Government, with the financing shared equally between the Austrian government and the respective province. The national park administrations offer more than 300 green jobs. The park centres provide the public with educational services on ecology and environmental protection, information and leisure activities. With about 400,000 visitors a year, they play an important role in Austrian tourism.

National Parks
Of the seven national parks, four are protecting Austrian Alpine regions and three are covering waters. The Neusiedler See–Seewinkel and Thayatal national parks stretch across the border with Hungary and the Czech Republic respectively.

All of Austria's national parks meet IUCN Category II standards. The Nock Mountains (formerly also one of Austria's National Parks) had been classified as a Protected Landscape (Category V), and in 2012 it was converted into the core zone of a UNESCO Biosphere Reserve.

See also
List of national parks
Geography of Austria

References

External links
 https://www.nationalparksaustria.at/en/ Official site.

 
Austria
National parks
National parks

he:גאוגרפיה של אוסטריה#פארקים לאומיים